Croatian Australians are Australian citizens of Croatian ancestry. Croatia has been a source of migrants to Australia, particularly in the 1960s and 1970s. In 2021, 200,000 persons resident in Australia (0.6%) identified themselves as having Croatian ancestry.

History 

Croats were first noticeable in Australia during the gold rushes of the 1850s in the province of Victoria. At this time, Croats were coded as "Austrians" because most of Croatia was a part of the Habsburg Empire. By Federation of Australia in 1901, there were many Croats—mainly from Dalmatia—in Australia, counted with Czechs, Hungarians, Serbs, Slovaks and others as "Austro-Hungarians". The establishment of the Kingdom of Serbs, Croats and Slovenes from Austria-Hungary after the First World War — renamed as Yugoslavia shortly afterwards —continued to make it difficult to separate out Croats from other ethnicities in Australia. Croats were not recorded separately until the 1996 Census. The Australian Department of Immigration believes many Croats holding old (and now long out of date) Yugoslav passports still record themselves as Yugoslavs in Australian censuses, over a decade after the disintegration of Yugoslavia.

There is also a community of Croats who follow Islam, the descendants of those who converted after the 16th century, after the conquest of much of Croatia and Bosnia by the Ottomans. They established their Croatian Islamic Centre in Maidstone. with a masjid. Croatian Seventh-Day Adventists meet in St. Albans and Springvale, while in Sydney they meet in Dundas. There are Croatian-speaking Catholic congregations throughout Melbourne, Sydney, Adelaide, Canberra and Perth. St Nikola Tavelic Church in Clifton Hill is an important religious centre for Croats in Melbourne. 

Nevertheless, it is known that Croats formed a large proportion of those Yugoslavs who settled in Australia the 1960s and 1970s under Australian Government migration schemes. The Yugoslavia-born population reached 129,616 by the 1971 Census and 160,479 by the 1991 Census. The greatest number settled in Sydney and Melbourne, though Croats are well represented in every Australian city and region.

During the 1960s and 1970s, many Croatians were constantly under ASIO surveillance for alleged terrorist activities organised by the Yugoslav secret service, several of whom were named in the media. Some of the longest running and most expensive court cases in Australian history involved Croatians charged with terrorism-related charges that were proven falsified, including the 'Croatian Six' who were convicted on tainted evidence. Federal Attorney-General Lionel Murphy created a media sensation when he led a raid on ASIO Headquarters looking for files on Croatian terrorist activities and not finding any at all, spurred on by claims of non-surveillance by ASIO and that ASIO focused too much of its time on student anti-war groups instead of terrorist groups, though there may have been no terrorist activities for ASIO to investigate.

In November 1977, an unofficial Croatian embassy was opened in Canberra, causing a legal and diplomatic difficulty for both the Australian and Yugoslav governments. The embassy, aimed at raising awareness of Croatia as a nation and the Croatian people separate from Yugoslavia, remained open for 2 years closing in 1979. Its ambassador Mario Despoja is the father of former Democrats leader Natasha Stott Despoja.

Since the independence of Croatia in the 1990s, an official embassy has been opened in Canberra and consulates have been opened in Melbourne, Sydney and Perth.

Demographics 

At the 2006 Census 50,993 persons resident in Australia identified themselves as having been born in Croatia, representing about 0.25% of the Australian population. The Census also noted 118,046 persons identified themselves as having Croatian ancestry, either alone or in combination with another ancestry.

Croatian Australians are more likely to be resident in Victoria than any other state. As at 2006, 35.7% of Croats live in Victoria (where only 25% of the total Australian population reside). A further 36.2% of Croatian Australians reside in New South Wales (compared with 33% of the total Australian population).

As the level of immigration from Croatia has dropped significantly from the 1980s (70% of Australian residents born in Croatia arrived before 1980
), the Croatian-born population is ageing: 43% of the Croatian-born population was aged sixty years old or older at the time of the 2006 Census.

As at the 2006 census 33,012 Croatian-born Australians (65%) speak Croatian at home; 17% of Croatian-born Australians speak English at home. Proficiency in English was self-described by census respondents as very well by 31%, well by 32%, 17% not well, 2.3% not at all (18% didn't state or said not applicable).
In 2001, the Croatian language was spoken at home by 69,900 persons in Australia.

Of the Australian residents who were born in Croatia, 48,271 or 95% were Australian citizens at the time of the 2006 census. According to 2006 census data released by the Australian Bureau of Statistics, 94% of Croatian born Australians recorded their religion as Christian. 2001 census data released by the Australian Bureau of Statistics in 2004, showed denominational affiliation by Croatian Australians was: 85.6% Catholic, 0.9% Anglican, 4.5% Other Christian, 1.4% claiming other Religions, and 7.6% claiming no religious affiliation. According to the 2016 Census, a fast majority (73.1%) of the Croatia-born population was Catholic, followed by Eastern Orthodox (9.6%) and other Christian denominations (5.1%). Around 7% of the Croatia-born population had no religion.

Croatian Australians have an exceptionally low rate of return migration to Croatia. In December 2001, the Department of Foreign Affairs estimated that there were 1,000 Australian citizens resident in Croatia, mainly in Zagreb.

Croatian Australians and soccer

Croats in Australia and their Croatian Australian offspring are notable for their commitment to soccer, with numerous clubs established throughout the country, the most notable and successful being Sydney Croatia and Melbourne Croatia. These clubs nurtured the soccer talents of a large number of Croatian Australians, many of whom now play professionally overseas. Croatian Australians have played for both Croatia and Australia. In the 2006 World Cup, there were seven Croatian Australians playing for Australia and three playing for Croatia.  A total of 47 Croatian Australians have gone on to play for the Australian national soccer team, including 7 who captained the national team. The Australian-Croatian Soccer Tournament is the oldest running soccer competition in Australia.

Croatian Australian Socceroos

Croatian Australian Matildas
Emily Gielnik

Croatian Australians in Croatian national team
Anthony Šerić
Josip Šimunić
Joey Didulica

List of notable Croatian Australians

Entertainment and the arts
 Steve Abbott - comedian, The Sandman, Russian/Croatian mother
 Eric Bana – actor (Croatian father)
 Charles Billich – artist
 Nathaniel Buzolic – actor
 Branka Čubrilo – novelist – Croatian born, migrated to Australia 1992.
 Ante Dabro – sculptor
 Natalie Franceska (nee Blažević) - children's author
 Robert Jozinović – actor
 Melita Jurisic - actress
 Robert Luketić – film director
 Tatjana Lukić – poetry editor and poet
 Robyn Ravlich - poet
 Ivan Sen – film director - Croatian father, Aboriginal mother
 Marisa Siketa – actress
 Mark Strizic - Photographer and painter.
 Frances Vidakovic - author and blogger.
 Emma Viskic - author - Croatian father, Irish Australian mother.

Music
 Alison Wonderland – electronic dance music producer, DJ and singer.
 Russell Baricevic - bass guitar - Bored, Pray TV, The Gas Babies, Macho Clowns, Unclean Spirits
 Peter "Blackie" Black – (Croatian mother) – musician, founding member of The Hard-Ons.
 Philip Bračanin – composer and musicologist.
 Josipa [Knežević] Draisma - comedian, singer, actor, writer and theatre maker.
 Mikelangelo (Michael Simic) aka The Balkan Elvis - singer (solo, Johnny Presley and the Zagreb Allstars, Mikelangelo and the Tin Star). Father is Croatian from Tučepi, Croatia.
 Steve Pavlovic – music entrepreneur
 Roddy Radalj – musician, founding member of the Hoodoo Gurus, the Dubrovniks and Roddy Ray'Da & the Surfin' Caesars. 
 Rex Radonich (1950-1986) - Banjo player in Australian Bluegrass band Bullamakanka. Was regarded as the best at picker at the time. Grandson of Mate Radonic (born Podgora Croatia) of New Zealand.
 Natalie D-Napoleon - (Croatian father and mother) - Australian singer-songwriter and poet.
 Tony Slavich - keyboardist - Ariel, Sun, Mike Rudd and the Heaters, Mondo Rock, Goldrush, Ross Ryan band, Richard Clapton Band.
 Adalita, born Adalita Srsen, solo performer and member of Magic Dirt. Her father is Croatian.
 Boris Sujdovic – (Croatian mother) – musician, founding member of The Scientists, the Dubrovniks, Beasts of Bourbon. 
 Simone Young - (Croatian mother) - Australian conductor
 Samantha Tutić, stage name: Samsaruh – musician, born and raised to Croatian parents in Melbourne, sung and recorded in Croatian

Academia
 David Andrich – academic 
 Luka Budak – author, Head of Croatian Studies, Macquarie University. 
 Val Colic-Peisker – associate professor, sociologist and author.
 Vesna Drapac – Associate Professor of History at University of Adelaide, author ("Constructing Yugoslavia: A Transnational History" 2010).
 Roman Krznaric – social philosopher, author ("The Wonderbox: Curious histories of how to live" 2011, "How to Find Fulfilling Work (The School of Life)" 2013 , "How Should We Live?: Great Ideas from the Past for Everyday Life" 2015, "Empathy: Why It Matters, and How to Get It" 2015, "The First Beautiful Game: Stories of Obsession in Real Tennis" 2015, "Carpe Diem: Seizing the Day in a Distracted World" 2017) and founder of the Empathy Museum. 
 Ralph Pervan (1938–1980) – academic and author ("Tito and the students : the university and the university in self-managing Yugoslavia" 1978), namesake of the "Ralph Pervan scholarship", University Hall, Western Australia.

Science and medicine
 Tony Bacic - biologist
 Brice Bosnich - chemist
 Stjepan Marcelja - physicist
 Boris Martinac - biophysicist
 Ivan Marusic - physicist
 Vlado Perkovic – physician
 Zed Rengel - environmental scientist
 Ralph Sarich – Inventor of the revolutionary Orbital Engine, and at one stage, in the 1970s, Australia's richest person.
 Frances Separovic- biophysical chemist
 Hrvoje Tkalčić - geophysicist

Business and work
 Jim Bosnjak – former owner of Westbus, the biggest bus company in Australia
 Katarina Carroll (nee Bošnjak) – first female Police Commissioner, for the State of Queensland. Her parents are from Ljubuški, Bosnia and Herzegovina.  
 Tony Cobanov, owner Windy creek Estate Wines (formerly Cobanov Wines), Swan Valley, Western Australia whose grandfather, Ante Cobanov, came to Australia in 1924 and commenced the winery in 1937.
 Trojano Darveniza (1838-1937). Winemaker / Vintner. Born in Dalmatia. Founder and owner of Excelsior Vineyards in Victoria.
 Kirk, Adam, and Tony Dundo, owners Katgully Winery, Swan Valley, Western Australia, whose grandfather came from Blato and Cara on the island of Korcula.
 Juli Grbac, fashion designer who was the first winner of Project Runway Australia. 
 Tony Šantić – Millionaire tuna fisherman, horse breeder and owner of Makybe Diva
 Tony and Ron Perich –  brothers, property development, on Forbes Australia's 20 Richest people 2019.
 Zeljko Ranogajec – businessman and professional gambler.
 John Setka -  Australian Trade Union leader

Media
 Charmaine Dragun – journalist
 Laura Dundovic – Top 10 finalist of Miss Universe 2008
 Tom Dusevic – journalist, author ("Whole Wild World", 2016)
 friendlyjordies - Jordan Shanks-Markovina; independent journalist, YouTuber, stand-up comedian and former model (Scottish father, Croatian mother)
 George Grljusich – sports journalist
 Sarah Harris – journalist
 Andrew O'Keefe – TV personality (Croatian mother)
 Amos Gill – Comedian, Radio and TV Presenter
 Silvio Rivier –  Television presenter (born in Croatia, migrated to Australia in 1961).

Politics
 Mick Nanovich - politician (Liberal Party), Western Australia
 Tony Krsticevic – politician (Liberal Party), Western Australia
 John Newman – Born John Naumenko, politician (Labor Party) NSW. 
 Jaye Radisich – politician (Labor Party), Western Australia
 Ljiljanna Ravlich – politician (Labor Party), Western Australia
 Zed Seselja – politician, senator (Liberal Party), ACT
 Natasha Stott Despoja – federal politician, senator (Australian Democrats) - South Australia
 Zorana Balaban - lawyer (Websters lawyers), South Australia

Other
 Mate Alac - (Born Drašnice, Croatia 1908 - 1997)- Miner (in Western Australia) and author of memoir "Into The World" (1992).
 Vincent Abbott – gold hunter, pioneer of the  Murchison Goldfields and who had the town of Abbotts, Western Australia named after him. He was born Vincent Vranjican in the town of Starigrad, Island of Hvar, Dalmatia, Croatia.
 Matthew Beovich - Roman Catholic priest, Archbishop of Adelaide.
 Blaž Kraljević – Croatian and Bosnian general
 Ivan Milat – notorious serial killer (Croatian father)
 Vincent Serventy – a noted Australian author, ornithologist and conservationist.
 Tom Starcevich – World War 2 Victoria Cross recipient 
 Frank Vitkovic - perpetrator of the Queen Street Massacre, half-Croat through his father

Sport
 Jason Akermanis - His father, Denis Dezdjek, is Croatian.
 Noah Balta - Australian rules footballer
 Alex Banovich – rowing
 Adrian Barich – Australian rules and rugby league footballer
 Andrew Barisic – football (soccer) player, Kingfisher East Bengal
 Andrew Bogut – basketball player, Sydney Kings; formerly with several NBA teams
 Tiana Boras - Track and field
 Mark Bosnich – former football (soccer) player, Australia, now soccer TV analyst
 Mark Bresciano – football (soccer) player, Al Nasr and Australia (Croatian mother)
 Ante Čović – footballer (soccer) player, Elfsborg and Australia
 Jason Čulina- football (soccer) player, Gold Coast United and Australia
 Alan Didak – Australian rules footballer
 Joey Didulica – former Croatian footballer
 Bronko Djura - former rugby league footballer and cricketer 
 Jelena Dokic – tennis player (Croatian mother)
 John Dorotich – Australian rules footballer
 Anthony Drmic – basketball player, Adelaide 36ers
 Frank Drmic – basketball player, last played for South Dragons
 Mate Dugandzic – football (soccer) player, Adelaide United FC
 Ray Gabelich – Australian rules footballer
 Eugene Galekovic – football (soccer) player and Socceroo
 Darren Gaspar – Australian rules footballer
 John Gerovich – Australian rules footballer
 Antony Golec – football (soccer) player, Central Coast Mariners, formerly Sydney FC, Sydney United and Adelaide United
 Brent Grgić – Australian rules footballer
 Ivan Henjak – former Rugby league footballer and coach
 Matt Henjak – Rugby union player, Toulon and formerly Australia (nephew of Ivan)
 Allen Jakovich – Australian rules footballer
 Glen Jakovich – Australian rules footballer
 Vedran Janjetović – football (soccer) player
 Mile Jedinak – footballer (soccer), Aston Villa and Australia.
 Wayne Johnston – Australian rules footballer
 Tomi Jurić – footballer (soccer) and Socceroo
 Željko Kalac- former football (soccer) player, Kavala and Australia, now soccer TV analyst
 Anthony Kalik – footballer 
 Simon Katich – Australian Cricket representative
 Max Krilich – Australian rugby league footballer who played in the 1970s and 1980s
 Anthony Leban - Australian footballer
 Dean Lukin – Olympic weight lifting gold medallist
 Ivan Maric – Australian rules footballer
 Marinko Matosevic – Tennis player
 Nicola McDermott – Australian high jumper
 Brody Mihocek - Australian rules footballer
 Jack Mihocek - Australian rules footballer 
 Ante Milicic – former football (soccer) player, Rijeka and Australia
 Tomislav Mrčela – Australian footballer, NK Lokomotiva and Australia
 Len Pascoe – Australian Cricket representative
 Matthew Pavlich – Australian rules footballer
 Anthony Perosh – mixed martial arts fighter
 Val Perovic – Australian rules footballer
 Tony Popović – former football (soccer) player and current manager
 Jack Rocchi – Australian rules footballer
 Ivan Rukavina - boxing
 Steven Salopek – Australian rules footballer
 Tony Sekulić - former football (soccer) player 
 Anthony Šerić – football (soccer) player, Hajduk Split and Croatia
 Josip Šimunić – former football (soccer) player, Hoffenheim and Croatia
 Elvis Sinosic – mixed martial arts fighter
 Josip Skoko – former football (soccer) player, Hajduk Split and Australia
 Ivan Soldo - Australian rules footballer
 Craig Starcevich – Australian rules footballer
 Peter Sumich – Australian rules footballer
 Erik Surjan – decathlete
 Jacob Surjan – Australian rules footballer
 Ajla Tomljanović - tennis player 
 Bernard Tomić – tennis player
 Steven Ugarković – football player
 Mark Viduka – former football (soccer) player for numerous club teams and Australia
 Dennis Yagmich – cricket
 David Zdrilić – football (soccer) player, now soccer TV analyst
 Ned Zelić – former football (soccer) player for numerous club teams and Australia, now soccer TV analyst
 Noah Botić – football (soccer) player

See also 
 Ustaše in Australia
 Croatian New Zealanders
 European Australians
 Europeans in Oceania
 Immigration to Australia
 List of Croatian soccer clubs in Australia
 List of Croats
 Croatian Canadians
 Croatian Americans

References

Further reading

 Colic-Peisker, Val.(2000) Croatian and Bosnian migration to Australia in the 1990s. Studies in Western Australian history, No.21, (Being Australian women), p. 117–136.
 Colic-Peisker, Val.(2004) Split lives : Croatian Australian stories North Fremantle, W. Aust. : Fremantle Arts Centre Press.

External links 
 http://www.cronet.com.au/ – Australian Croatian community portal
  (Croatians in Sydney)
 https://www.taliwine.com.au/aboutus
 https://katgully.com.au/about-us/
 https://www.windycreekestate.com.au/about-us.html 
 https://www.swanvalley.com.au/Business-Directory/John-Kosovich-Wines

 
 
 
Australian
European Australian
Immigration to Australia